James Henry Kenneth Adams (born 23 September 1980), known as Jimmy Adams, is an English former professional cricketer. He played as a left-handed batsman and left-arm medium-pace bowler.

He first starred for the England Under-19s having previously represented his country at the Under-15 and Under-19 World Cups. Having been named as Hampshire's Young Player of the Year, he captained Loughborough UCCE in 2003 and made his maiden first-class century against Somerset in 2003.

He was a member of Hampshire's 2005 Cheltenham & Gloucester Trophy winning squad. In 2008, Adams played three Minor Counties fixtures for Dorset.

During the 2009 season, Hampshire progressed to win the final of the 2009 Friends Provident Trophy. Adams scored half-centuries in both the semi-final and the final sharing large opening stands with Michael Lumb, including 55 runs in a stand of 93 with Lumb in the final at Lord's, helping Hampshire to a 6 wicket victory over Sussex.

Adams reached the landmark of 5,000 first-class cricket runs against Yorkshire on 22 August 2009, in their County Championship Division One match. During the 2009 County Championship season Adams scored 1,280 at an average of 53.33 to make him Hampshire's leading run scorer for the season.

Adams scored his maiden one-day century against Warwickshire with a score of 131 in the 2010 Clydesdale Bank 40 and his maiden Twenty20 Century against Surrey at the Rose Bowl on Sunday 13 June. He scored 101 not out from 65 balls.

Following the end of the 2010 season, he signed for Auckland Aces for the HRV Twenty20 Cup, helping them to win the title with a top score of 62 off 43 in the final.

References

External links 
 James Adams at ECB
 

1980 births
English cricketers
Auckland cricketers
Hampshire cricketers
Dorset cricketers
Living people
Loughborough MCCU cricketers
Cricketers from Winchester
British Universities cricketers
Marylebone Cricket Club cricketers
People educated at Sherborne School
Alumni of University College London
Alumni of Loughborough University
People educated at Twyford School